Armando Fernández (born 11 May 1955) was a Mexican and later German former water polo player who competed in the 1972 Summer Olympics, in the 1976 Summer Olympics, in the 1984 Summer Olympics, and in the 1988 Summer Olympics.

See also
 Germany men's Olympic water polo team records and statistics
 List of Olympic medalists in water polo (men)
 List of players who have appeared in multiple men's Olympic water polo tournaments
 List of men's Olympic water polo tournament top goalscorers

References

External links
 

1955 births
Living people
Mexican male water polo players
Mexican emigrants to Germany
German male water polo players
Olympic water polo players of Mexico
Olympic water polo players of West Germany
Water polo players at the 1972 Summer Olympics
Water polo players at the 1976 Summer Olympics
Water polo players at the 1984 Summer Olympics
Water polo players at the 1988 Summer Olympics
Olympic bronze medalists for West Germany
Olympic medalists in water polo
Medalists at the 1984 Summer Olympics
Pan American Games gold medalists for Mexico
Pan American Games medalists in water polo
Water polo players at the 1975 Pan American Games
Medalists at the 1975 Pan American Games